Robert Shute (c. 1576 - 10 February 1621) was an English lawyer and politician who sat in the House of Commons between 1620 and 1621.

Shute was the son of Robert Shute, Justice of the Queen's Bench and his wife Thomasine Burgoyne, daughter of Christopher Burgoyne, of Longstanton,  Cambridgeshire.  He matriculated from Christ's College, Cambridge in 1599 and was admitted at Gray's Inn on 21 November  1600.  He was awarded BA at Cambridge in 1602 and MA in 1605.

He was clerk of the Court of Common Pleas in 1616 and became Recorder of London in 1621. In 1620, he was elected Member of Parliament for St Albans.  He sat for St Albans until his death in February 1621.

References

1570s births
1621 deaths
Lawyers from London
People from St Albans
Members of Gray's Inn
Alumni of Christ Church, Oxford
Alumni of the University of Cambridge
Recorders of London
English MPs 1621–1622
Year of birth unknown
Politicians from London